This is a list of notable real estate companies of the Philippines.
 Arthaland
 Aseana Holdings
 Ayala Land
 Cebu Landmasters
 Century Properties
 DMCI Homes 
 DoubleDragon Properties
 Federal Land
 Filinvest Land, Inc. 
 Isoc Land
 Italpinas Development Corporation
 Megaworld Corporation  
 MRC Allied
 Phinma Properties
 Property Company of Friends 
 Robinsons Land Corp.
 Rockwell Land Corp.
 SM Prime Holdings
 Sta. Lucia Land Inc. 
 Vista Land

 
Real estate